Azhagiya Tamil Magal is a 2017 Indian Tamil-language soap opera starring Sathya Sai, Puvi, Subalakshmi and Anju Aravind. It premiered on Zee Tamil on 28 August 2017. The show ended on 14 June 2019 after 457 episodes.

The story is of a village girl named Poongkodi, who is a kabaddi player. The game will change her life and take her to Chennai to fund her education and helps pursue her further studies. The series is a remake of the Telugu language television show Mutyala Muggu which was broadcast on Zee Telugu in 2016.

Synopsis
The show showcases the story of Poongkodi, a kabaddi and Bharatnatyam enthusiast, who dreams of excelling in the field of sports and pursues further studies. However, the bitter past of Poonkodi's mother prevents Poonkodi from excelling.

Poongkodi's teacher and her grandfather push her to participate in a kabaddi game that will change her life and take her to Chennai to fund her education and pursue higher studies. She is pulled down by her rival Deepika whom she later discovers is her half-sister. Poongkodi goes through various tiffs. Meanwhile, there is a love triangle between Deepika, Jeeva and Poongkodi. How will her life change after this truth is revealed and how it affects the entire family forms the crux of the story.

Cast

Main
 Sheela Rajkumar as Poongkodi
 Sathya Sai replaced Rajkumar in this role.
 Puvi Arasu as Jeevanantham (Jeeva)
 Subalakshmi Rangan as Deepika (Poongkodi's half-sister)

Recurring
 Anju Aravind as Saroja (Poongkodi's mother)
 Seetha Anil replaced Aravind in this role.
 Saakshi Siva
 Shari (Sadhana) as Rajamma (Deepika's grandmother)
 Sivaranjani as Seetha Devi (Deepika's mother)
 Usha Sai as Maarii
 Veena Venkatesh as Parvathy (Sethupathy first wife, Ravi's mother, Deepika's grandmother)
 Ashwin Kumar as Gowtham
 Kanya Bharathi as Maya (Jeeva's mother)
 Gopi as Raghavendran
 Divya Banu as Ananya
 Sam as Rasukutty
 Sai Gopi as Sethupathy (Parvathy and Rajamma's husband, Ravi's father, Poongkodi and Deepika's grandfather)

Production

Casting
This is a village romance love story that aired on Zee Tamil. Actress Sheela Rajkumar was selected to portray the lead role and then later Sathya Sai replaced the role of Poongkodi. Puvi Arasu landed in the lead main role. Both Puvi Arasu and  Subalakshmi Rangan play the lead role for the first time, and Subulakshmi Rangan, known for her work on Ganga, was selected to co-star as Deepika. Ashwin Kumar, Saakshi Siva, Kanya Bharathi, Usha Sai and Shari (Sadhana) were selected to play other important roles.

Soundtrack
It was composed by Vishal Chandrasekhar and the background score was by Jai Kishan.

Adaptations

Awards and nominations

References

External links
 

Zee Tamil original programming
Tamil-language sports television series
Tamil-language romance television series
2017 Tamil-language television series debuts
Tamil-language television series based on Telugu-language television series
Tamil-language television shows
2019 Tamil-language television series endings
Television shows set in Tamil Nadu